Trey Pollard (born November 19, 1982) is an American arranger, music producer, composer, conductor and instrumentalist in Richmond, Virginia. As co-owner and in-house arranger of Spacebomb Records, Trey has arranged orchestral arrangements for artists such as Matthew E. White, Natalie Prass, Foxygen, Helado Negro, The Waterboys, and Charlie Fink.  In 2017, he composed music for the podcast S-Town from the producers of This American Life and Serial.

Discography
 Matthew E. White – "Big Inner" (2012) string arranger
 Helado Negro – "Island Universe Story: Two" (2013) string arranger
 Grandma Sparrow – "Grandma Sparrow & His Piddletractor Orchestra" (2014) string arranger, horn arranger 
 Helado Negro – "Island Universe Story: Three" (2014) pedal steel
 Natalie Prass – "Natalie Prass" (2015) string arranger, horn arranger, pedal steel
 Matthew E. White – "Fresh Blood" (2015) producer, arranger, guitar, pedal steel
 Helado Negro – "Private Energy" (2016) piano, pedal steel
 Foxygen – "Hang" (2017) orchestral arrangements, pedal steel
 Charlie Fink – "Cover My Tracks" (2017) string and woodwind arrangements
 The Waterboys – "Out Of All This Blue" (2017) string and brass arrangements
 Noam Weinstein - "Undivorceable" (2022) string arrangements & conducting

References

External links
[ allmusic Discography]

1982 births
Living people
American male conductors (music)
American male composers
American music arrangers
Record producers from Virginia
Classical musicians from Virginia
21st-century American conductors (music)
21st-century American male musicians
Spacebomb Records artists
Musicians from Richmond, Virginia